Honeycomb Nebula is a supernova remnant located  150 000 light years away in the Dorado constellation.

References

Supernova remnants
Dorado (constellation)
Large Magellanic Cloud